Siwan is a Lok Sabha constituency in the state of Bihar in India. The Lok Sabha is the lower house of the Parliament of India. The constituency was formed following the States Reorganisation Act of 1956 and the constituency boundaries were readjusted by the Delimitation Order of 2008. The constituency consists of 6 Assembly segments (constituencies) of the Bihar Legislative Assembly.

Overview
The Siwan constituency of the Lok Sabha is encompassed in the administrative district of Siwan of the state of Bihar. The constituency is assigned the number 18 of the 40 Lok Sabha constituencies of the state of Bihar by the Election Commission of India. It consists of 6 Assembly segments (constituencies) numbered 105–110 of the Bihar Legislative Assembly, one of which is reserved for Scheduled Caste (SC) candidates in accordance with the Delimitation Order of 2008 implemented on the basis of the Delimitation Act of 2002. The Siwan constituency of the Lok Sabha has no reservation status.

Assembly segments

Members of Parliament

Election results

2019 elections

2014 elections

2004 election

See also
Siwan
List of Constituencies of the Lok Sabha

References

External links
Siwan lok sabha  constituency election 2019 result details

Lok Sabha constituencies in Bihar
Politics of Siwan district